Mariana Bracetti Cuevas (also spelled Bracety) (July 26, 1825 – February 25, 1903) was a patriot and leader of the Puerto Rico independence movement in the 1860s. She is attributed with having knitted the flag that was intended to be used as the national emblem of Puerto Rico in its attempt to overthrow the Spanish government on the island, and to establish the island as a sovereign republic. The attempted overthrow was the Grito de Lares, and Bracetti's creation became known as "The Flag of Lares." The flag's design was later adopted as the official flag of the municipality of Lares, Puerto Rico.

Early years
Bracetti, born in the city of Añasco, Puerto Rico, met and developed a romantic relationship with Miguel Rojas Luzardo, a rich Venezuelan businessman visiting Añasco. Rojas and his brother Manuel owned a coffee plantation called "El Triunfo" near Lares. Miguel and Manuel Rojas were admirers of Dr. Ramón Emeterio Betances and were influenced by his ideals of independence for and beyond Puerto Rico. Bracetti married Rojas with whom she had children.

The first independence movement flag of Puerto Rico
Bracetti then moved to the hacienda "El Triunfo", which was to become the clandestine nucleus of the revolution that would be known as  El Grito de Lares.  The Rojas' admiration for Betances led them to join him in the conspiracy to rebel against, and gain independence from, Spain.

The Rojas brothers became the independence leaders in Lares and their code name was Centro Bravo (Bravo Center).  Manuel Rojas, Bracetti's brother-in-law, was named Commander of the Liberation Army.  Mathias Brugman was the independence leader in Mayagüez and his group went by the code name of Capa Prieto (Dark Cape).

Bracetti's nickname was Brazo de Oro (Golden Arm) and she was appointed the leader of the "Lares's Revolutionary Council."  Betances suggested that Bracetti knit the first flag (modeled on the Dominican Republic's flag) of the future "Republic of Puerto Rico." With the materials provided by Eduvigis Beauchamp Sterling, named Treasurer of the revolution by Betances, Bracetti designed and knitted the flag taking into consideration Betances's suggestions. The flag was divided in the middle by a white Latin cross, the two lower corners are red and the two upper corners are blue. A white star was placed in the upper left blue corner. According to Puerto Rican poet Luis Lloréns Torres the white cross on the Revolutionary Flag of Lares stands for the yearning for homeland redemption; the red squares, the blood poured by the heroes of the rebellion and the white star in the blue solitude square, stands for liberty and freedom.

El Grito de Lares
On the morning of September 23, 1868, an Army of about 800 men met in the El Triunfo plantation and Manuel Rojas proceeded to take the town of Lares, which initiated the revolution known as El Grito de Lares. Once the town was taken, Bracetti's flag was placed on the High Altar of the Parroquial Church. The revolutionists declared Puerto Rico a republic, swore in Francisco Ramírez Medina as its first president and celebrated a speedy mass.

The rebel forces then departed to take over the next town, San Sebastián del Pepino. The Spanish militia, however, surprised the group with strong resistance, causing great confusion among the armed rebels who, led by Manuel Rojas, retreated back to Lares. Upon an order from the governor, Julián Pavía, the Spanish militia soon rounded up the rebels. All of the survivors, including Bracetti, were imprisoned in Arecibo and the insurrection was quickly brought to an end. The original Lares flag was taken by a Spanish army officer as a war prize and many years later returned to the Puerto Rican people. It is now exhibited in the University of Puerto Rico's Museum. Eighty of the prisoners died in jail, Bracetti however, lived and was released on January 20, 1869, when the new Spanish Republican government granted them general amnesty.  Mariana Bracetti died in the municipality of Añasco, Puerto Rico in 1903 and was buried in the Plaza of Añasco. There is a monument honoring her on the spot where she is buried.

Legacy

Juan de Mata Terreforte, a revolutionist who fought alongside Manuel Rojas in the Grito de Lares, and who was the Vice-President of Puerto Rican Revolutionary Committee, a Chapter of the Cuban Revolutionary Party in New York City, adopted Bracetti's "Flag of Lares" as the flag which represented Puerto Rico. It became their standard until 1892 when the current design, modeled after the Cuban flag, was unveiled and adopted by the committee.

Bracetti was the principal subject of two books: El Grito de Lares by Luis Lloréns Torres, and Brazo de Oro by Cesáreo Rosa-Nieves. Her memory has been honored in Puerto Rico and elsewhere with schools, streets and avenues named after her. In Lares, there is a Mariana Bracetti Museum and in Philadelphia there is a Mariana Bracetti Academy Charter School. The Mariana Bracetti Plaza and public housing development in New York City was also named after her. The  public housing development built and maintained by the New York City Housing Authority in New York City's Lower East Side.

See also

Corsican immigration to Puerto Rico
List of Puerto Ricans
History of women in Puerto Rico
For the Mexican professional wrestler "Brazo de Oro", click here.

19th century female leaders of the Puerto Rican independence movement

María de las Mercedes Barbudo
Lola Rodríguez de Tió

Female members of the Puerto Rican Nationalist Party

Blanca Canales
Rosa Collazo 
Lolita Lebrón
Ruth Mary Reynolds
Isabel Rosado
Isabel Freire de Matos
Isolina Rondón
Olga Viscal Garriga

Articles related to the Puerto Rican Independence Movement

Puerto Rican Nationalist Party Revolts of the 1950s
Puerto Rican Nationalist Party
Ponce massacre
Río Piedras massacre
Puerto Rican Independence Party
Grito de Lares
Intentona de Yauco

References

Further reading
Puerto Rican Women/Mujeres Puertorriqueñas (Paperback). By Carmen Delgado Votaw (author), Michelle Sague (editor), and Pat Barton (illustrator); 
 

1825 births
1903 deaths
Flag designers
People from Añasco, Puerto Rico
Puerto Rican people of Corsican descent
Puerto Rican rebels
Puerto Rican prisoners and detainees
Puerto Rican women in politics
Puerto Rican women in the military
Imprisoned Puerto Rican independence activists
Puerto Rican independence activists
19th-century Puerto Rican people
Female revolutionaries